Elia Galligani (born 8 June 1992) is an Italian footballer who plays as a striker for  club San Donato.

Club career 
Elia Galligani was born in Viareggio on 8 June 1992 in Lucca, Tuscany, Italy. He made his debut with goals among professionals on 27 September 2020 at the age of 28.

He started playing at the age of 5 in the National Center, for the youth sector of his city.

He went to the youth academy of Lucchese at the age of 14.

His first season among the greats arrives at the age of 17 in the Tuscan championship of excellence and for five years he toured various teams in the region.

At the age of 23 he made his debut in Serie D with the Lavagnese team where he collected 21 appearances with 2 goals and 4 assists.

The following year he moved to Juventus Domo, in the Piedmontese championship, where he scored 10 goals in 25 appearances from the right wing.

He returns to Serie D the following year in the jersey of his hometown Viareggio. Concluding the year with 36 appearances, 8 goals and 7 assists.

In the 2018–2019 season he wears the San Donato Tavarnelle shirt, collecting 9 goals and 9 assists in 36 appearances.

The 2019–2020 season he plays with the Grosseto, concluding with 25 appearances, 9 goals and 3 assists and the victory of the Serie D championship which stopped first due to covid.

Reconfirmed in 2020–2021 with Grosseto in Serie C, he finished the season with 11 goals and 7 assists in 36 appearances.

To Conclude the season Grosseto has earned a chance in the playoffs which have started with a first game win where Elia contributed an assist.

On 15 July 2021, he signed a one-year contract with Carrarese.

On 13 January 2022, he moved to Mantova.

On 13 July 2022, he joined to San Donato.

External links 
 Historical career on tuttocampo.it (In Italian)
 Football profile on Diretta.it

References

1992 births
Living people
People from Viareggio
Sportspeople from the Province of Lucca
Footballers from Tuscany
Italian footballers
Association football forwards
Serie C players
Serie D players
U.S.D. Lavagnese 1919 players
F.C. Esperia Viareggio players
San Donato Tavarnelle players
U.S. Grosseto 1912 players
Carrarese Calcio players
Mantova 1911 players